Goal! is a 1988 soccer/football video game published by Jaleco for the Nintendo Entertainment System. The game supports up to two players.

Gameplay
The game has four modes: World Cup, Tournament, League, Shoot Competition, Asian Cup and Vs. Mode. The object of the game is the same as in real football; one team must score more goals than the other to win.

When playing World Cup League or Tournament mode Asian mode with two players, the players can either play on the same team or against each other.

Jaleco followed the game with several sequels and localizations, including Goal! Two for the NES (titled Goal! in the North American SNES version, and retitled Super Goal! for the European release), and Super Goal! 2. In 1993, Jaleco published Tose's Game Boy port of Goal!, which Tose adapted from their Japanese Game Boy release J-Cup Soccer.

References

External links

1988 video games
1992 video games
Association football video games
Game Boy games
Jaleco games
City Connection franchises
Nintendo Entertainment System games
Tose (company) games
Multiplayer and single-player video games
Video games developed in Japan